James Kyle is the name of:

 James Kyle (bishop) (1788–1869), Roman Catholic bishop who served as the first Vicar Apostolic of the Northern District of Scotland
 James Kyle (cricketer) (1879–1919), Australian cricketer
 James H. Kyle (1854–1901), American politician, United States Senator from South Dakota
 Jim Kyle (born 1950), American lawyer and politician